Guy Fournier, CM (born 23 July 1931 in Waterloo, Quebec) is a Quebec author, playwright, and screenwriter.

From 8 September 2005 to 19 September 2006 he was chairman of the board of directors of the Canadian Broadcasting Corporation.

Personal life
He is the twin brother of Claude Fournier and the uncle of Jean-Vincent Fournier.

He has been married twice, first to actress Louise Deschâtelets and later to filmmaker Aimée Danis.

Controversy 

In May 2006, he attracted a number of complaints after an appearance on the Quebec television show Tout le monde en parle in which he stated that at his age he enjoyed defecation more than sexual intercourse.

In September 2006, Fournier penned a piece for the Quebec magazine 7 jours in which he sought to make a point about treatment of homosexuals in Lebanon, which included the line:

Following extremely negative public reaction to these falsehoods, he appeared on  Tout le monde en parle to apologize and indicate he would refrain from writing for 7 jours in the future and instead concentrate on his CBC duties.  However, several more days of news coverage followed, which also focused on his previous comments about defecation.

On 19 September 2006, Fournier resigned from his position as CBC chairman which was accepted by Heritages Minister Bev Oda. Members of Parliament applauded Fournier's decision to step down - Independent MP André Arthur being the only one known MP to denounce his resignation.

Filmography 
 1974 : La Mer mi-sel
 1975 : Jo Gaillard (TV series)
 1977: Jamais deux sans toi
 1983 : Maria Chapdelaine
 1994 : Cœur à prendre (TV)
 1994 : My Friend Max (Mon amie Max)

References

Living people
1931 births
Canadian screenwriters in French
Members of the Order of Canada
Canadian television executives
Canadian twins
People from Montérégie
Quebecor people